Darweshpura (also known as Deveshpura) is a village in the taluk of Katrisarai of the Nalanda district, in the state of Bihar, Eastern India.

Darweshpura has a humid subtropical climate, with hot summers and cool winters.  The predominant economic activity in the village has traditionally been subsistence agriculture and sheep and goat herding.

References

Villages in Nalanda district